A. maritimus may refer to:

 Ammodramus maritimus, a bird species
 Anguliphantes maritimus, a spider species
 Anotylus maritimus, a rove beetle species
 Asteriscus maritimus, a plant species
 Augyles maritimus, a mud-loving beetle species

See also
 Maritimus (disambiguation)